The Cleveland Institute of Music (CIM) is a private music conservatory in Cleveland, Ohio. Founded in 1920 by Ernest Bloch, it enrolls 325 students in the conservatory and approximately 1,500 students in the preparatory and continuing education programs. There are typically about 100 openings per year for which 1,000-1,200 prospective students apply.

Many members of The Cleveland Orchestra serve as faculty at CIM and CIM alumni can be found in major orchestras throughout the United States and the world.

Campus
CIM is located in the University Circle, a four-mile square neighborhood on the east side of Cleveland.

Opened in 1961, the main building houses teaching studios, practice rooms, recital halls, a music library, and classrooms. The building was expanded in 2007, adding 34,000 square feet of space. This included a new entryway and lobby, an expansion to the music library, a new recital hall, recording/broadcast suites, new practice rooms, and additional administrative offices.

Through a cooperative arrangement with nearby Case Western Reserve University, CIM students have full access to many university amenities, and, if accepted to both institutions, can pursue a dual degree both at CIM and Case Western Reserve.

Accreditation
The Cleveland Institute of Music is accredited by two agencies:
National Association of Schools of Music
The Higher Learning Commission

Notable people

Alumni
 Ryan Anthony, trumpeter
 Alan Baer, Principal Tuba, New York Philharmonic
 Benny Bailey, jazz trumpeter
 Mike Block, cellist, singer, composer
 Jim Brickman, pianist
 Nickitas J. Demos, composer
 David Diamond, composer
 Elaine Douvas, Principal Oboe, Metropolitan Opera Orchestra, Chair of Woodwind Department, Juilliard School
 Dennis Eberhard, composer
 Donald Erb, composer
 John Ferritto, composer and conductor
 Chuck Findley, brass player
 Aubrey Foard, tubist
 Grace Fong, Director of Keyboard Studies at Chapman University Conservatory of Music.
 Jim Hall, guitarist
 Joseph Hallman, composer
 Thomas Hill, clarinet
 Wataru Hokoyama, composer
 Frank Huang, violinist
 Judith Ingolfsson, violinist
Stefan de Leval Jezierski, horn, Berlin Philharmonic
 Megumi Kanda, Principal trombone, Milwaukee Symphony Orchestra
 Andy Kubiszewski, rock drummer, songwriter, and record producer
 Anton Kuerti, pianist, composer, and conductor
 Martin Leung, pianist
 John Mackey, composer
 Robert Marcellus, clarinetist
 Stephen Marchionda, guitarist
 Tariq Masri, Principal Bassoon, Alabama Symphony Orchestra
 Peter McCoppin, conducting
 Mildred Miller, mezzo-soprano
 Kermit Moore, cellist
 Judy Niemack, jazz singer
 Kam Ning, violinist
 Yuriy Oliynyk, composer and pianist
 Greg Pattillo, flautist
 Ann Hobson Pilot, harpist
 Kermit Poling, conductor and composer
 Nikola Resanovic, composer
 Joshua Roman, cellist
 Hale Smith, composer, arranger, pianist, and editor
 Mark Summer, cellist
 Irwin Swack, composer
 Howard Swanson, composer
 Jerod Impichchaachaaha' Tate, composer and pianist
 Gerardo Teissonnière, pianist and teacher
 Bross Townsend, jazz pianist
 Daniil Trifonov, pianist
 Jason Vieaux, guitarist
Katharine Mulky Warne, composer, founder of Darius Milhaud Society
 Alisa Weilerstein, cellist
 John McLaughlin Williams, conductor and violinist
 Jasper Wood, violinist
Jane Corner Young, composer
 PROJECT Trio, chamber music ensemble

Faculty
 Sergei Babayan, piano
 Victor Babin, piano
 Greg Banaszak, saxophone
 Mordecai Bauman, voice
 Ernest Bloch, composition
 Margaret Brouwer, composition
 Sergio Calligaris, piano
 Alice Chalifoux, harp
 Yin Chengzong, piano
 Vinson Cole, voice
 Max Dimoff, double bass
 Andrew Földi, voice
 Maurice Goldman, voice
 Jamey Haddad, percussion
 Grant Johannesen, piano
 Ilya Kaler, violin
 Yolanda Kondonassis, harp
 Edwin Arthur Kraft, organ
 William Kroll, violin
 Jaime Laredo, violin
 Denoe Leedy, piano
 Arthur Loesser, piano, writer
 John Mack, oboe
 Antonio Pompa-Baldi, piano
 Quincy Porter, composition
 Sharon Robinson, cello
 Bernard Rogers, composition
 Beryl Rubinstein, piano and composition
 David Shifrin, clarinet
 Leonard Shure, piano
 Eleanor Steber, voice
 Yi-Kwei Sze, voice
 Gerardo Teissonnière, piano
 Nevada Van der Veer, voice
 Robert Vernon, viola
 Jason Vieaux, guitarist
 Vitya Vronsky, piano
 Todd Wilson, organ
 Ivan Zenaty, violin

References

External links

 

 
Educational institutions established in 1920
1920 establishments in Ohio
Music schools in Ohio
University Circle
Universities and colleges in Cleveland
Private universities and colleges in Ohio